Coimbatore Metro, also known as Kovai Metro, is a proposed rapid transit system for Coimbatore, Tamil Nadu.

History
The Central Government proposed a metro rail system for 16 tier-2 cities in India including Coimbatore in 2010. While the Government of Tamilnadu in 2011, shelved in favour of a monorail. Coimbatore Railway Struggle Committee has also protested to implement metro rail project in Coimbatore. In 2013, E. Sreedharan made survey and announced metro rail as suitable transport for Coimbatore. In January 2017, a Coimbatore District Administration official told The Hindu that there was no mass rapid system presently under consideration for Coimbatore. Government of Tamilnadu again announced for the proposal of metro rail at Coimbatore in 2017. Railway Minister Suresh Prabhu has announced that Central Government is ready to implement and fund metro rail project in Coimbatore. State Government has also approved for metro rail. The works was expected to begin by the financial year 2017/18, but it hadn't. CM Edipaddi K. Palaniswami announced metro rail plan for Coimbatore. He also announced that the feasibility study will be conducted and Detailed Project Report (DPR) will be prepared by Chennai Metro Rail Limited (CMRL) and the funds will be provided by German-based KFW company. CMRL releases tender notice for preparing the project's DPR and feasibility report.

SYSTRA Group bags the tender to prepare feasibility study and DPR. Feasibility study submitted to the Government and waiting for approval. SYSTRA Group, has also approached the district administration and the city municipal corporation to furnish details about development work to be implemented in the city and state highways, national highways roads and National Highways Authority of India (NHAI) roads. Based on the details provided by the district administration and the corporation, the private company would prepare the DPR.

This project is initially proposed as a monorail later converted to metro rail project and now the project has been converted into Metro rail lite project.

Project timeline
2011: Central Government under former Prime Minister Manmohan Singh announces metro rail projects for Tier II cities, where Coimbatore is also included.
2011: Tamil Nadu Government under former Chief Minister J. Jayalalithaa shelves the metro rail project in favour of monorail.
2013: E. Sreedharan makes survey and announces metro rail as suitable transport for Coimbatore.
2017: Tamil Nadu Government under former Chief Minister Edappadi K. Palaniswami again announced metro rail for Coimbatore.
2017: Tamil Nadu Government announces the commencement of Coimbatore Metro Project works by financial year 2017-18 and it got approval from state and central government
2017: Railway Minister Suresh Prabhu also announces that Central Government is ready to launch and fund the Coimbatore Metro Project.
2017: Tamil Nadu Government announces that feasibility study would be conducted and Detailed Project Report (DPR) will be prepared for Coimbatore Metro by Chennai Metro Rail Limited (CMRL), and the fund will be provided by German-based KFM company.

2017: Tamil Nadu Government orders CMRL to float tenders. CMRL releases tender notice for preparing Coimbatore Metro's DPR and feasibility report.
2018: CMRL replied to a Coimbatore-based RTI filed by Sudandhira pon vandhiyathevan a resident of coimbatore to PM cell that Feasibility cum DPR is under preparation
2018: CMRL floats tender for Coimbatore Metro's DPR and feasibility report preparation.
2018: German-based KFW Company shortlists five firms to prepare the DPR and feasibility study for Coimbatore Metro.
2019: Feasibility study and DPR under preparation by SYSTRA Group.
2019: Feasibility study has been submitted by SYSTRA Group to the Government and is waiting for approval.
2019: SYSTRA Group has approached the district administration and the city municipal corporation to furnish details about development work to be implemented in the city and state highways, national highways roads and National Highways Authority of India (NHAI) roads. Based on the details provide by the district administration and the corporation, the private company would prepare the DPR.
2020: CMRL Held a meeting with the Highways Department and Coimbatore corporation officials and discussed the implementation of the metro project. A section of the metro route was suggested to be changed because of its clashing with the Ukkadam flyover. A metro line is planned to extend up to Vellalore to connect to the new bus terminus.
2020: A fifth metro line has been proposed to connect CIBT at Vellalore with Ukkadam.
2021: Tamil Nadu Government Allocates ₹ 6,683 crore as funds to carry out Coimbatore Metro Rail Project in 2021-22 Financial Budget.
2021: RITES floats tender for topographical survey of Coimbatore Metro Rail Project.
2021: Land survey begins for Coimbatore Metro Rail Project.
2021: Prime meridian begins feasibility study survey work for Coimbatore metro.
2021: A group of engineers along with MLA of the constituency tested the proposed metro route which is clashing with the under construction flyover, but its result is the pillars erected for the flyover can't be converted for metro project and they are seeking for alternative proposal on that route either by constructing underground Metro line for 10 kilometers or other alternative route.
2022 : Finance Minister PTR. Palanivel Thiagarajan announces Preparation of Detailed Project Report is under final stages by CMRL, soon funds will be allocated by central government and construction will start.
2022:A detailed project report (DPR) for phase one of a mass rapid transit system for Coimbatore is in the final stage of finalisation. The first phase will be for 44 km on Avinashi Road and Sathyamangalam road.
2022: An RTI filed by Chennai-based RTI activist Dayanad Krishnan revealed that Chennai Metro Rail Limited (CMRL) is expected to complete the Coimbatore metro lite rail project for phase I corridors in 2027 and the total cost for the project is ₹9,424 crores.
2023: Rs 9000 crore allotted for Coimbatore Metro rail route between Avinashi Road and Sathyamangalam Road in the 2023 - 24 Budget session

Proposed Corridors
Proposed Metro Rail Routes in Coimbatore Based on CMP and Feasibility study

Planning

Phase 1
The phase 1 of "Coimbatore Metro" is planned to implement two corridors from Coimbatore Integrated Bus Terminus to Neelambur and from District Collector Office to Valiyampalayam Pirivu covering 44 kilometers at a cost of ₹9,424 crore. The DPR suggested a Metrolite model but the officials said that the decision to make it a metrolite or to retain as a metro rests with the state government. The Phase 1 focus to implement Corridor 5 (pink line) from Coimbatore Integrated Bus Terminus and Ukkadam Bus Terminus completely and the partial completion of Corridor 1 (red line) from Ukkadam Bus Terminus to Neelambur and the Corridor 4 (green line) from Ukkadam Bus Terminus to Valiyampalayam Pirivu. With 40 stations planned, the Phase 1 will cover major transportation hubs in the city such as Coimbatore Integrated Bus Terminus, Coimbatore International Airport, Gandhipuram Central Bus Terminus, Coimbatore Junction, Ukkadam Bus Terminus and Podanur Junction. It will also connect major commercial hubs such as Townhall, Ukkadam and Gandhipuram

Phase 2 and Phase 3
The remaining parts of Corridors 1 and 4 and the complete portion of Corridors 2 and 3 is planned to be completed in Phases 2 and 3.

See also 
Chennai Metro
Kochi Metro
Madurai Metro

References

Transport in Coimbatore
Standard gauge railways in India
Proposed rapid transit in India
Proposed infrastructure in Tamil Nadu